The 2009–10 Scottish Challenge Cup, known as the ALBA Challenge Cup due to sponsorship reasons with MG Alba, was the 19th season of the competition, competed for by all 30 members of the Scottish Football League. The previous winner was Airdrie United, who defeated Ross County 3–2 on penalties after a 2–2 draw in the 2008 final. Airdrie United were knocked out in the first round by Partick Thistle after a 1–0 loss.

The final was contested by Dundee and Inverness Caledonian Thistle at McDiarmid Park, Perth on Sunday 22 November 2009.  The competition was won by Dundee who came back from 2–0 down to eventually clinch the victory, 3–2.

Schedule

First round 

The first round draw was conducted on 28 May 2009.

North and East region 
Dundee received a random bye to the second round.

Source: BBC Sport

South and West region 
East Stirlingshire received a random bye to the second round.

Source: BBC Sport

Second round 
The second round draw was conducted on 28 July 2009 at Hampden Park, Glasgow.

Source: BBC Sport

Quarter-finals 
The quarter-final draw was conducted on 20 August 2009 at Hampden Park.

Semi-finals 
The semi-final draw was conducted on 10 September 2009.

Final

References

External links 
 BBC Scottish Cups page
 Scottish Football League Challenge Cup page

Scottish Challenge Cup seasons
Challenge Cup
Challenge Cup